St. George's Anglican Church may refer to: 
 St George's Anglican Church, Beenleigh, Queensland, Australia
 St George's Anglican Church, Eumundi, Queensland, Australia
 St. George's Anglican Church (Parrsboro, Nova Scotia), Canada
 St. George's Anglican Church (Montreal), Quebec, Canada
 St. George's Anglican Church, Berlin, Germany
 St George's Anglican Church, Madrid, Spain
 St. George's Anglican Church (Basseterre), Saint Kitts and Nevis
 St. George's Church, Lisbon, the English-speaking Anglican congregation in Lisbon
 St George's Church, Gravesend, an Anglican church in Kent, England
 St. George's Anglican Church, Grenada
 St. George's Church (Georgetown, Ontario), an Anglican church in Ontario, Canada
Saint George's Anglican Church (Moncton), New Brunswick, Canada
St. George's Anglican Church, Ventura, California
St. George's Church, Penang, an Anglican church in Penang, Malaysia
St. George's Anglican Church, Battery Point, Hobart, Tasmania
St. George's Church, Vernet-les-Bains, an Anglican church in Pyrénées-Orientales, France
St. George's Anglican Church, Knokke, Knokke, Belgium
St. George's Cathedral, Jerusalem, an Anglican cathedral in Jerusalem
St George's Church, Venice, an Anglican church in Italy
St George's Anglican Church, WIllowdale, Toronto
St. George's (Round) Church (Halifax, Nova Scotia), an Anglican church in Canada
St. George's Anglican Church, Sibbald Point, Ontario, Canada
St. George's Anglican Church, St. Catharines, Ontario, Canada
St George's Anglican Church, Brassall, Queensland, Australia
St George's Anglican Church, Linville, Queensland, Australia
St. George's Anglican Church, Chennai, India
St. George's Anglican Church, Bathurst, New Brunswick
St. George's Cathedral, Georgetown, Guyana
St George's Church, Everton
St. George's Cathedral, Cape Town, South Africa
St George's Cathedral, Perth, Australia
St George’s Anglican Church, Málaga, Spain
St. George's Anglican Church, Sutton West, Ontario, Canada
St George's Anglican Church, Hanover Square, Westminster, London
St George's Anglican Church, Whatley, Somerset, England
St George's Anglican Church, Kendal, Cumbria, England
St. George's Anglican Church, Lisbon, Portugal
St George's Anglican Church, Georgeham, Devon, England
St George's Anglican Church, British Embassy in Madrid
St. George' s Anglican Church, Brigus, Newfoundland and Labrador, Canada
St George's Anglican Church, Crows Nest, Queensland, Australia
St George's Anglican Church, Barcelona, Spain
St. George's Anglican Church, Helmetta, New Jersey, United States

See also
 St George's Church (disambiguation)
 St. Mary & St. George Anglican Church, Alberta, Canada